Svitlana Azarova (born 9 January 1976) is a Ukrainian-Dutch composer of contemporary classical music, originally from the Ukrainian SSR.

Early years
Svitlana Azarova was born on 9 January 1976, in Izmail, then in the Ukrainian SSR, now in Ukraine.

After having graduated in music from Odesa Pedagogical Institute as in 1996, Azarova entered Odesa Conservatory, where she studied musical composition, first under the Ukrainian composer Oleksandr Krasotov, and later (until 2000) under the Ukrainian author and composer Karmella Tsepkolenko.

In 2003 Azarova participated for six months in the  scholarship program, at the Frédéric Chopin Academy of Music in Warsaw, under Marcin Blazewicz. This project met again at the 8th Musica Viva in Munich in 2007.
	
In 2005 With a grant of the society KulturKontakt Austria she elected to participate in the 9th International Academy for New Composition and Audio-Art, Avantgarde Tirol with Professor Boguslaw Schaeffer and Dr. Richard Boulanger (Seefeld, Tirol, Austria).
After this academy, she took up permanent residency of The Hague and in 2006 began post-graduate studies at conservatoire in Amsterdam under Theo Loevendie where she graduated Master of Music in December 2007

Composer Residencies:
 2007, 2015, 2016 - Visby International Centre for Composers (VICC) (Gotland, Sweden)
 2008 - Czech Music Information Centre (Prague, Czech Republic)

Career

The music of Svitlana Azarova is performed by ensembles and orchestras internationally. This includes

 Petra Stump, clarinet (Austria)
 Mariko Nishioka percussion (Japan)  and Yuka Sugimoto percussion (Japan)
 Nieuw Ensemble (The Netherlands)
 Stephan Vermeersch (Belgium)
 Marcel Worms (The Netherlands)
 Ensemble pass_ПОРТ (Ukraine - Germany - Brazil - France), Conductor: Kevin John Edusei
 Sinfonia Iuventus, conductor: Roman Rewakowicz (Poland)
 Eastern Connecticut Symphony Orchestra conducted by Toshiyuki Shimada
 Orchestre national d'Île-de-France (ONDIF) conductor Enrique Mazzola
 Netherlands Philharmonic Orchestra  (NedPho) conductor Marc Albrecht
 Royal Danish Opera conductor Anna-Maria Helsing

Compositions
 2019
 Hoc Vinces! for large orchestra
 2015-2016
 Momo and the time thieves; the story of the child, who brought the stolen time back to the people full size opera in two acts for large orchestra, choir and soloists.  Based on the novel Momo (novel) by Michael Ende; commissioned by the Royal Danish Opera, world premiere 15 October 2017 on the big stage of Copenhagen Opera House (Holmen).
 2014
 Hundred thirty one Angstrom symphony for large orchestra
 2013
 Concerto Grosso for violin, viola solo and string orchestra
 2011
 Mover of the Earth, Stopper of the Sun for symphony orchestra (overture), commissioned by ONDIF
 I fell into the sky... for viola solo World premièred by Emlyn Stam of New European Ensemble
 2010
 Pure thoughts transfixed symphony for large orchestra
 2008
 Beyond Context for chamber orchestra, commissioned by the Polish Institute in Kyiv
 From this kind... for choir, brass and percussion on words by Oksana Zabuzhko
 2007
 300 steps above for carillon
 Trojaborg for solo clarinet
 Epices for soprano, bass clarinet, trompet, perc., piano, violin
 Un cortado para Michel for baroque flute (traverso) and soundtrack
 Onderdrukte Haast (Suppressed Haste) for Brass Quintet
 On Tuesdays for ensemble with words by Daniil Harms. World premièred by Nieuw Ensemble
 2006
 Sounds from the Yellow Planet for ensemble and recordings of throat singing by Khoomei virtuoso Nikolay Oorzhak
 Model Citizens for violoncello and piano, commissioned by Doris Hochscheid and Frans van Ruth
 Valentina's Blues for piano, commissioned by Marcel Worms and published on his CD Red, White and Blues, 32 New Dutch Blues (Attacca Records #27103)
 2005
 Hotel Charlotte for string quartet
 Dive for violin and piano
 The Violinist's morning espresso for violin
 2004
 Outvoice, outstep and outwalk for bass clarinet
 Asiope for ensemble

 2003
 Go-as-you-please for ensemble
 Symphonic Lana Sweet for large symphony orchestra
 Slavic Gods for flute, clarinet, accordion and cello
 West - East for ensemble
 Don't go: not now for flute, oboe and bassoon
 Feet on Fire for 2 percussion
 Funk Island for corno bassetto and piano
2002
 In the Icy Loneliness for 2 cellos
 Axis of Every Karuss... for clarinet, piano and cello
 2001
 As for the Clot it is Slowly...  for solo tuba
 2000
 The Dance of Birds for string orchestra
 Chronometer for piano
 1999
 Symphonic Poem for large symphony orchestra
 Diagram  for 5 cellos
 Punished by Love vocal cycle on verses by Ludmyla Olijnyk (in Russian) for soprano and piano
 Sonata-Diptych for clarinet and piano

Sources
 Paolo Tortiglione TortiglioneSvitlana Azarova in Semiography and Semiology of Contemporary Music, Edizioni Rugginenti, 2013
 Slaby, Z. + Slaby, P. Svitlana Azarova in The Encyclopedia of the World of Another Music (Svìt jiné hudby), vol. 2. Prague: Volvox Globator Publishing House, p. 73 - 74
 Kötter, D. Svitlana Azarova, Asiope, WestEast 8. Musica Viva Veranstaltung 2006 | 2007 [Sonderveranstaltung] p. 7, 10
 Von Adelbert and Reif, R. R. pass_PORT and Svitlana Azarova in Applaus #6/2007 p. 32
 Schwarz, S. Svitlana Azarova in Offende Grenzen in Süddeutschen Zeitung Wochenendeausgabe 30. Juni/1 Juli 2007
 Vojzizka, E. review of Chronometer in Kievskij Telegraf #40 13 October 2005, p. 7
 Desiateryk, D. Svitlana Azarova and pass_PORT in Kyiv The Day #28, Tuesday, 26 October 2004
 Perepelytsya, O. Svitlana Azarova in Contemporary composers of Ukraine reference guide-book, Issue 1. Odessa 2002 Association New Music, p. 100-101
 Bukkvoll, Tor & Thuesen, Nils Petter. (2014, 8. juni). Svitlana Azarova in Contemporary composers of Ukraine Store norske leksikon. Retrieved 14. Dec. 2014.

References

External links 
 
 Streaming radio programme from Conzertzender (in Dutch)
 Svitlana Azarova — Muziek Centrum Nederland (MCN)

1976 births
21st-century classical composers
21st-century Dutch composers
21st-century women composers
Conservatorium van Amsterdam alumni
Dutch classical composers
Dutch women classical composers
Dutch opera composers
Women opera composers
Living people
People from Izmail
String quartet composers
Ukrainian classical composers
Ukrainian opera composers
K. D. Ushinsky South Ukrainian National Pedagogical University alumni